Waitby is a civil parish in the Eden District, Cumbria, England.  It contains nine listed buildings that are recorded in the National Heritage List for England.  Of these, one is listed at Grade II*, the middle of the three grades, and the others are at Grade II, the lowest grade.  The parish contains the villages of Waitby and Smardale and is otherwise rural.  The listed buildings consist of houses and associated structures, farmhouses and farm buildings, and a bridge, a boundary stone, and a former school.

Key

Buildings

Notes and references

Notes

Citations

Sources

Lists of listed buildings in Cumbria